Blanford's short-toed gecko (Cyrtopodion brevipes) is a species of gecko, a lizard in the family Gekkonidae. The species is endemic to southeastern Iran.

Geographic range
In Iran, C. brevipes is found in the province of Sistan and Baluchestan.

References

Further reading
Blanford WT (1874). "Descriptions of new Lizards from Persia and Baluchistán". Ann. Mag. Nat. Hist., Fourth Series 13: 453–455. (Gymnodactylus brevipes, new species, p. 453). (in English and Latin).
Boulenger GA (1885). Catalogue of the Lizards in the British Museum (Natural History). Second Edition. Volume I. Geckonidæ ... London: Trustees of the British Museum (Natural History). (Taylor and Francis, printers). xii + 436 pp. + Plates I-XXXII. (Gymnodactylus brevipes, p. 28).
Rösler, Herbert (2000). "Kommentierte Liste der rezent, subrezent und fossil bekannten Geckotaxa (Reptilia: Gekkonomorpha)". Gekkota 2: 28–153. (Cyrtopodion brevipes, new combination, p. 68). (in German).

Cyrtopodion
Reptiles described in 1874